Vincent McMahon may refer to:

 Vince McMahon (born 1945), former chairman and CEO of World Wrestling Entertainment
 Vincent J. McMahon (1914–1984), wrestling promoter
 Vincent McMahon (cricketer) (1918–1988), Australian cricketer